Badruddin Jamaluddin Kazi (1924? – 29 July 2003), better known by his stage name Johnny Walker, was an Indian actor who acted in around 300 films. He was best known for his humorous roles in Indian films, notably being typecast as a hapless drunkard.

Early life 
Badruddin Jamaluddin Kazi was born in Indore, British India (present-day Madhya Pradesh, India), one of twelve children of a weaving teacher. Sources generally place his date of birth around 1924.

When his father lost his job, the family moved to Mumbai. Kazi, who got a job as a Bombay Electric Supply & Transport (BEST) bus conductor, took it upon himself to entertain his passengers with his comical way of calling out bus stops, his hilarious impressions and tricks.

Throughout his youth, he dreamed of being involved in films, idolising Noor Mohammed Charlie and practicing stunts that he saw on-screen. He got a break in the film industry after actor Balraj Sahni encountered him introduced him to actor and director Guru Dutt without the latter’s knowledge after being amused by Kazi's antics.

Career 
Johnny Walker nurtured his desire to work in films and entertained passengers while working the BEST buses with amusing routines, hoping that he would at some point be spotted by someone with connection in a film.  Balraj Sahni was either at that time writing the script for Baazi (1951), or acting in Hulchul, told Kazi to demonstrate his drunkard act to Guru Dutt. From that meeting, he gained a role in Baazi. It was Guru Dutt who gave him the name of Johnny Walker, a reference to the brand of Scotch whisky, when he was inspired by Kazi's display in the role of a drunkard.

Thereafter, Walker appeared in all but one of Dutt's movies and the director encouraged him to ad lib and to draw on his varied life experiences. He was primarily an actor of comedic roles but towards the end of his life became disenchanted, saying, "Earlier, comedians had a respectable position and an almost parallel role with the protagonist, now it is just to bring a touch of humour. I don't buy that." His attempts to portray heroic personae in the eponymous Johnny Walker and Mr. Qartoon were not successful but films such as Mere Mehboob, C.I.D., Pyaasa and Chori Chori made him a star. His heyday was in the 1950s and 1960s and his later career was affected by the death of Dutt, who had greatly influenced it, in 1964. He worked with directors such as Bimal Roy and Vijay Anand but his career faded in the 1980s. He was unwilling to adopt the cruder form of comedy and changed priorities that had become the vogue, saying that

Johnny Walker was particularly satisfied with his work in B. R. Chopra's Naya Daur (1957), Chetan Anand's Taxi Driver (1954) and Bimal Roy's Madhumati (1958). His final film came after an absence of 14 years when he took a role in a remake of Mrs. Doubtfire titled Chachi 420 (1997). During the intervening period, he had a successful business dealing with precious and semi-precious stones.

Some songs were written especially for him. His drawing power at the box office was such that distributors would insist on him having a song and would pay extra to ensure it.  He is the second actor to have one or more Hindi films in his name, Johnny Walker (1957), the first being the actress, Madhubala with a 1951 eponymous film, but the only one with two (the other being Malayalam film, Johnnie Walker.  He was the first actor to keep a secretary/manager. He was the first actor to stop working on Sundays. He was the first actor to bring Colloquialism to cinema Taxi Driver. He also produced and directed the 1985 film Pahunche Huwey Log.

Personal life 
Johnny Walker married Noorjahan, sister of Indian actress Shakila, despite the opposition of her family. They had three daughters and three sons, of whom one is actor Nasirr Khan. Regretting that he had been forced to leave school at 6th class, he sent his sons to the US for schooling.

Despite often playing the roles of a drunkard, Johnny Walker was a teetotaller and claimed to have never drunk alcohol in his life.
Johnny Walker died on 29 July 2003 after a period of illness.

Awards 
Filmfare Best Supporting Actor Award for his role in Madhumati
Filmfare Best Comedian Award for his role in Shikar

Filmography 

Johnny Walker acted in around 300 films, including:

1950-1959

1960-1969

1970-1979

1980-2000

References

External links

 
 Dilip Kumar on Johnny Walker at Outlook magazine
 Why Johnny Walker left bollywood? at editorji magazine

2003 deaths
Male actors from Indore
Indian male film actors
Indian male comedians
Male actors in Hindi cinema
Filmfare Awards winners
20th-century Indian male actors
20th-century comedians